The John Stout House is a historic house in Hamilton, Montana. It was built in 1900 for John Stout, a farmer from Missouri. In 1910, it was inherited by his daughter Josephine, who lived here with her husband, John McClintic. The latter worked for copper baron Marcus Daly.

The house was designed in the Colonial Revival and Queen Anne architectural styles. It has been listed on the National Register of Historic Places since August 26, 1988.

References

National Register of Historic Places in Ravalli County, Montana
Queen Anne architecture in Montana
Colonial Revival architecture in Montana
Houses completed in 1900
Houses on the National Register of Historic Places in Montana
Hamilton, Montana
Houses in Ravalli County, Montana